Implication may refer to:

Logic
 Logical consequence (also entailment or logical implication), the relationship between statements that holds true when one logically "follows from" one or more others
 Material conditional (also material consequence, or implication), a logical connective and binary truth function typically interpreted as "If p, then q"
 material implication (rule of inference), a logical rule of replacement 
 Implicational propositional calculus, a version of classical propositional calculus which uses only the material conditional connective
 Strict conditional or strict implication, a connective of modal logic that expresses necessity
 modus ponens, or Implication elimination, a simple argument form and rule of inference summarized as "p implies q; p is asserted to be true, so therefore q must be true"

Linguistics 
 Implicature, what is suggested in an utterance, even though neither expressed nor strictly implied
 Implicational universal or linguistic universal, a pattern that occurs systematically across natural languages
 Implicational hierarchy, a chain of implicational universals; if a language has one property then it also has other properties in the chain
 Entailment (pragmatics) or strict implication, the relationship between two sentences where the truth of one requires the truth of the other

Other uses 
 Implication table, a tool used to facilitate the minimization of states in a state machine
 Implication graph, a skew-symmetric directed graph used for analyzing complex Boolean expressions
 Implication (information science)

See also 
 Material implication (disambiguation)
 Implicit (disambiguation)

Conditionals